Tânia Ferreira (born July 17, 1974 in Santos, São Paulo) is a female judoka and wrestler from Brazil. She won the bronze medal in the women's lightweight division (– 57 kg) at the 2003 Pan American Games in Santo Domingo, Dominican Republic and also two gold medals in South American games in Venezuela and Brazil. She represented her native country at the Judo at the 2000 Summer Olympics in Sydney, Australia. She achieved 21 results in judo and also continental results in wrestling.

References
  sports-reference

1974 births
Living people
Judoka at the 2003 Pan American Games
Judoka at the 2000 Summer Olympics
Olympic judoka of Brazil
Brazilian female judoka
Pan American Games bronze medalists for Brazil
Pan American Games medalists in judo
South American Games gold medalists for Brazil
South American Games medalists in judo
Competitors at the 2002 South American Games
Medalists at the 2003 Pan American Games
Sportspeople from Santos, São Paulo
21st-century Brazilian women
20th-century Brazilian women